Ness Digital Engineering Ness Digital Engineering is an American multinational technology corporation providing digital transformation services for media & entertainment, education, financial services, manufacturing & transportation, and independent software vendors. Ranjit Tinaikar has been the Chief Executive Officer of Ness Digital Engineering since February 2020. Founded in 1998 and headquartered in Teaneck, New Jersey, Ness is a leading provider of end-to-end digital transformation services specializing in building digital software products and platforms. Ness helps organizations envision, build, and continually evolve their digital platforms to enter new markets, capture new revenue, and gain operational efficiencies. The Company offers a wide range of digital practices, including cloud engineering, data and analytics, experience design, intelligence engineering, and Salesforce for businesses across sectors. Today, Ness has a presence in North America, Europe, the Middle East, and Asia, with a globally diversified talent pool across India, Eastern Europe, and the United States.

History
Ness Digital Engineering is an IT firm.
In 2011, Ness Digital Engineering had 5,000 employees around the world, with 10 satellite locations across the US, Europe, and India.

Between 1997 and 1999, New York investor Morris Wolfson, a principal of The Wolfson Group, acquired six Israeli IT companies. Following completion of these acquisitions, all the acquired companies were consolidated into a single operating structure, within Ness Technologies – a new company that was incorporated in Delaware in March 1999.

More than a decade later, Ness Technologies split into two distinct firms, Ness Technologies Israel and Ness Software Engineering Services (SES) with no affiliation to each other. In September 2016, Ness Software Engineering Services (SES) changed its name to Ness Digital Engineering to better reflect its market and business focus.

2022

 KKR, a global investment firm, acquires Ness Digital Engineering
 Ness acquires Niyuj leveraging their Product Engineering capabilities in the Networking, Storage and Security space. Expands its global presence to Pune.

2021

 Ness acquires Risk Focus leveraging their advisory services, FinTech, cloud and     data expertise to complete their transition to a full lifecycle digital transformation specialist while also expanding their global presence into     New York and Lativa
 Was named a leader in Engineering R&D Services in the Zinnov Zones Report     for the second consecutive year
 Named the Best Companies to Work for by CEO Insights India
 Romania Innovation Hub was named as the CEE Business Services Firm of the Year
 Achieved Premier Consulting Partner status with AWS
 Launches Centers of Excellence in 4 Major Industries

2020

 Ness announced its acquisition of CassaCloud, expanding its Salesforce presence     in the global market
 Was named a leader in Engineering R&D Services in the Zinnov Zones Report
 Ness launches strategic DACH and Manufacturing strategy and expands into     Germany
 Was a 2020 Golden Bridge Award Winner (Bronze) in Company Innovation for its     work designing digital solutions to enable business continuity and     employee safety during the COVID-19 pandemic
 Ness launches strategy to become a digital transformation specialist

2019

 Ness acquired Sovereign CRM to magnify Salesforce expertise
 Was recognized by Silicon India Magazine as a Best Company to Work for 2019

2013-16

 Ness grows its presence in Romania by opening a center in Timisoara
 Was ranked highest among peers for Agile delivery capabilities and named “one of seven vendors that matter most” for Digital Platform Engineering by Forrester

2011

 Ness Technologies goes private from being a public company.
 Core systems integration business in Israel spun off to focus on Digital Engineering. Ness Digital Engineering is born.

2002-2007

 Ness expands into product engineering markets outside Israel with the acquisitions of Innova Solutions, Apar, APP, Delta, and Radix. Ness grew its footprint into India (Bangalore, Mumbai, Hyderabad), the Czech Republic (Prague, Brno, Ostrava), Kosice & Iasi

2001

 Ness incorporated in Delaware and became the largest IT services firm in Israel

1999

 Ness originated in Israel as an Outsourced Product Development firm specializing in product engineering

Acquisitions
In June 2019, Ness Digital Engineering completed an acquisition of Sovereign CRM, a consultancy that specializes in the architecture, implementation, customization, and integration of Salesforce products.

In January 2020, Ness Digital Engineering announced its acquisition of CassaCloud, a Kosice, Slovakia-based consultancy.

In May 2021, Ness Digital Engineering acquired Risk Focus, a consulting and advisory firm.

In Jan 2022, Ness Digital Engineering acquires Niyuj leveraging their Product Engineering capabilities in the Networking, Storage and Security space. Expands its global presence to Pune

Awards and recognition

 Ness Digital Engineering (Kosice, Slovakia) has obtained the prestigious and superior international AAA TOP Gold Creditworthiness Certificate of Excellence - 2022. The TOP Gold Creditworthiness Certificate is a reward and result for a long-term conceptual high-quality performance. The award is based on a sophisticated methodology performed by Dun & Bradstreet and SIMS agency.
 Ness Digital Engineering has been named a leader in overall Engineering, Research, and Development (ER&D) for a second consecutive year by Zinnov Zones. Ness is one of the few at-scale pure digital engineering players recognized out of the 30 identified leaders in the 2022 Zinnov Zones report.  
 Ness Digital Engineering Romania has won the Business Services Firm of The Year – Romania award at the CEE Business Services Summit & Awards 2022 ceremony recently held in Warsaw, Poland. 
 Ness is now a Salesforce Crest Partner. This partnership will help clients accelerate their digital transformation journey with Salesforce using the expertise of Ness.
 Ness Digital Engineering has achieved Premier Partner status in the Amazon Web Services (AWS) Partner Network (APN). This differentiates Ness as an AWS Partner with demonstrated expertise and notable success in helping customers design, architect, build, migrate, and manage their workloads on AWS.
 Ness Digital Engineering is honored to announce it has been chosen as one of the Best Companies to Work For in 2021 by CEO Insights Magazine.
In 2020, Ness Digital Engineering was named a leader in Engineering R&D Services in the Zinnov Zones Report and a 2020 Golden Bridge Award Winner in Company Innovation for its work designing digital solutions to enable business continuity and employee safety during the COVID-19 pandemic.
 In 2019, Ness Digital Engineering was recognized by Silicon India Magazine as a Best Company to Work for 2019.
 In 2016, Ness Digital Engineering was named by Forrester as “one of seven vendors that matter most” for digital platform engineering and ranked highest among peers by Forrester for Agile delivery capabilities, receiving a 5 out of 5 rating.

Industry Consulting Services 
Ness nurtures engineering excellence and has invested expertise and resources in developing proprietary IP and Centers of Excellence in specific domains such as Financial Services, Manufacturing and Transportation, Media & Entertainment, and customized product development for ISVs and OEMs. 

Financial Services

 Banking Modernization
 Risk, Pricing, and Valuation Modernization
 Regulatory Reporting Modernization

Manufacturing & Transportation

 Mapping and Navigation Solutions
 Home Energy Management
 Fare Collection and Autonomous Electronic Toll Systems
 Predictive Analytics
 Connected Platform for Advanced Telematics & Fleet Management

Media & Entertainment

 Solutions for content providers in wholesale video
 OTT solutions for sports providers
 Royalty management solution for digital assets

Technology & ISVs

 Networking
 Security Solutions
 Storage Solutions

Digital Practices 
Ness has devised a set of specialized digital practices to enable companies to speed up their digital transformation efforts. These practices include Cloud Engineering for exploring or optimizing cloud engineering initiatives, Data & Analytics to build and modernize data infrastructure, processes and analysis methods, Experience Design to transform strategic engineering choices in data, automation, omnichannel integration, and ecosystem unification for engaging consumers, Intelligent Engineering to accelerate software engineering processes and innovation, and Salesforce services to help clients accelerate their digital transformation journey with Salesforce.

Geographical Locations 
North America

United States

Teaneck - New Jersey, Pittsburgh - Pennsylvania, San Jose – California

Canada

Mississauga – Ontario

Europe

United Kingdom

Birchin Lane – London

Czech Republic

Prague

Brno

Ostrava

Romania

Iasi

Timisoara

Slovakia

Kosice

Latvia

Riga

Germany

Hamburg

Middle East

Tel Aviv, Israel

Asia

Pune

Bangalore

Mumbai

Hyderabad

See also
Economy of Israel
Science and technology in Israel
Silicon Wadi

References

Information technology companies of Israel
International information technology consulting firms
Information technology consulting firms of India
Technology companies established in 1999
Companies formerly listed on the Nasdaq
Companies based in Tel Aviv